This is a list of islands of Ukraine. Note that During the 2014 Crimean crisis and Russian military intervention, Ukraine lost control over the Crimea, which was unilaterally annexed by Russia in March 2014 (most countries consider Crimea to be a part of Ukraine).

Sea of Azov
 Byriuchyi Island
Black Sea
 Berezan Island
 Zmiinyi Island, western Black Sea
 Dzharylgach, Karkinit Bay
 Dovhy and Kruhly islands serve as a natural boundary between Yahorlyk Bay and Black Sea
 Ship rock, rocks south of Opuk Cape, Kerch peninsula
 Adalary, pair of rocks near Gurzuf, Crimea
 Swan islands
Estuaries and straits
 Tuzla Island, Strait of Kerch
 Pervomaisky island
Rivers
 Venetsiansky Island and Dolobetsky Island, part of Hydropark, Dnieper
 Trukhaniv Island, Kyiv, Dnieper
 Khortytsia
 Big Potemkin Island, Kherson, Dniper

Spits
 Arabat Spit
 Behlytska Spit
 Kryva Spit
 Obytichna Spit
 Fedotov Spit
 Berdyansk Spit
 Tendrivska Spit, northern Black Sea

References

Ukraine, List of islands of

Islands